A Contraluz may refer to:

 A Contraluz (La Vela Puerca album), 2004
 A Contraluz (Luz Casal album), 1991